Halford Island is an uninhabited Baffin Island offshore island located in the Arctic Archipelago in the territory of Nunavut. The island lies in Frobisher Bay, south of Buerger Point.

References 

Uninhabited islands of Qikiqtaaluk Region
Islands of Frobisher Bay